Hutchinsonite is a sulfosalt mineral of thallium, arsenic and lead with formula . Hutchinsonite is a rare hydrothermal mineral.

It was first discovered in a sample from Binnental, Switzerland in 1903 and named after Cambridge mineralogist Arthur Hutchinson, F.R.S. (1866–1937) in 1904.

See also
List of minerals
List of minerals named after people

References

Further reading

Thallium minerals
Lead minerals
Arsenic minerals
Sulfosalt minerals
Orthorhombic minerals
Minerals in space group 61